Radio Dunedin is a radio station, broadcasting from Dunedin, New Zealand on 95.4 FM, 1305 AM, in the central city on 106.7 FM, and online.

The station was launched in late 1922, becoming the first radio station in New Zealand, and according to the station's website is the fifth oldest station in the world (five weeks older than the BBC).

Radio Dunedin is part of MediaWorks Radio, which operates several other stations including The Breeze (New Zealand radio station). MediaWorks runs the station from 6am and 6pm on weekdays. Air time is leased outside these hours by the Otago Radio Association, which is made up of volunteer presenters.

The station is aimed primarily at the 50+ age bracket, with a community focus, local news, and playing music primarily from the 1960s to 1980s. It is rated number three for share of commercial radio listening in Dunedin in the Radio Audience Measurement Survey.

History
The Otago Radio Association first went to air on 4 October 1922, and celebrates 100 years of broadcasting in 2022. The station has had a number of call signs over the years including DN, 4AB, 4ZB (not to be confused with the government-owned station of the same name), Pioneer Radio, and for from 1948 until the 1980s as 4XD. Between 1922 and 1990, 4XD was operated by the Otago Radio Association as a non-commercial and voluntarily-run radio station.  In 1990, Radio Dunedin was set up as a commercial station, and a few years later was purchased by Radio Otago Limited which also operated 4XO.

Radio Dunedin has broadcast to the greater Dunedin area (receivable in coastal Otago from Oamaru to Balclutha) on 1431 AM and 1305 AM, the latter of which it still uses.

In 1997, the station began simulcasting on 90.2 in FM Stereo, but this was for only a brief period before 90.2 FM became Lite FM and later Solid Gold. Over a decade passed before Radio Dunedin broadcast again in FM Stereo. Test signals began in mid-April 2008, with the official launch of 99.8 FM on Tuesday 6 May 2008.

After 7 years, MediaWorks decided to use 99.8 FM for its new nationwide network station Magic. As a result, on Monday 20 April 2015, Radio Dunedin moved to a low-power FM frequency of 107.7, which later changed to 106.7, with a range limited to the central city area.

On Monday 14 March 2016, Radio Dunedin commenced broadcasting to Mosgiel and surrounding areas in FM stereo on 95.4 – this frequency was previously a relay of 97.4 More FM, and originally Mosgiel FM and 4XO in the 1990s. 95.4 FM was originally broadcast from Chain Hill (above Wingatui) but now broadcasts from Saddle Hill.

Radio Dunedin introduced live streaming on the internet in mid-2007. It is also available on the Rova mobile app.

Slogans over the years have included "one of a kind", "easy listening", "easy listening hits", "hits and memories", and (since June 2011) "Good Talk, Good Music".

Radio Dunedin broadcasts locally from ASB House (known as "Radio Otago House" from 1996 to 2014) in the central city. Previous premises have been in Maclaggan Street and in the city's southern suburb of St Kilda. From October 2021 The Breeze Breakfast show, with Damian & Hannah, is simulcast on Radio Dunedin due to Owen Rooney's departure.

Noted presenters and on-air announcers have included "Toots" Mitchell, Colin Lehmann, Neil Collins and Owen Rooney

Local Programming: 
 Dunedin's Breakfast with Damian Newell and Hannah Wilkins from 6am weekdays. 
 Radio Dunedin afternoons with Dan Murphy from 12pm weekdays. 
 The Otago Radio Association from 6pm weeknights plus all weekends and public holidays. There are various shows hosted by volunteer announcers, all live & local.

"Radio Dunedin" the documentary

In 2017, a feature-length documentary film of the same name was produced. Radio Dunedin, the film was directed by Grant Findlay, and followed the history of the station which has faced many challenges over its years including arson attempts, Government takeovers, lack of funds and numerous technical issues.

Florida's "Radio Dunedin"

There is another Radio Dunedin, a one-hour show heard on WTAN-AM 1340 in Dunedin, FL (USA). This show and station are not affiliated with the New Zealand station.

References

External links 
 Official website
 Facebook

Radio stations in Dunedin